The Bibi Maryam Mosque, also known as the Hajiganj Mosque is situated in Hajiganj, Narayanganj. The mosque is said to have been constructed by Nawab Shaista Khan, Mughal subadar of Bengal. The construction of the mosque began in (1664), and finished in (1688).It took 24 years to construct the mosque. Bibi Maryam, who is apparently his daughter is said to be buried nearby in a tomb. The mosque is a three-domed type, the central dome being wider than the side ones. The reduction of the side domes is achieved by thickening the side walls instead of adding an intermediate half-dome as seen in some Mughal mosques. The basal leaf decoration of the domes and the battlemented merlons speak of the common style. The panel leaf decoration on the top of the roof is seen only on the front side. The eastern facade of the mosque has the usual three arched entrances, each opening under a half dome, and the central one being wider than the side entrances. Two windows, one each on the south and north sides, seem to be of later innovation. The four engaged corner towers, almost merged within the wall, are extended beyond the parapet. The interior hall shows simple lateral arches. The side bays are made square by thickening the side walls. The mosque has been repaired and renovated several times. It has lost much of its original features through repairs, especially since the corner towers are being completely modernised. A veranda on masonry pillars on the eastern side has completely overshadowed the front view. It is now being used as a Jami mosque.

History

Most historians suggest that Shaista Khan, the Mughal governor of the Bengal Subah from 1664 to 1688 built the mosque within a fortified complex in the early 1680s. Presumed to be Bibi Maryam's father, Khan named the site after his daughter's premature demise and also had her tomb built nearby. Historians who have examined the used building materials and applied construction techniques to learn that both were exercised during the age of Nawab Shaista Khan's existence. According to the present mosque authority, only members of Shaista Khan's family and administration formed the Muslim population of present-day Killarpul during its construction which explains the limited accommodation. Even as late as the 1950s, Killarpul's population was almost monopolised by Hindus, with hardly ten Muslims appearing for congregational prayer. This is in stark contrast to today, where hundreds of worshippers appear for any prayer.

Architectural elements and style 

The mosque was originally built as an extremely tall single-storied mosque with a great emphasis on vertical qualities. Three mihrabs are located in the western wall standing from the base of the ground floor to one-third the height of the first floor. These mihrabs have been compressed in width and shortened in height; otherwise, they would structurally relate to the three domes to portray one of the site's prime architectural essences. The remains of the authentic mihrabs are present on the first floor and rise as much as one-third of their height in the western wall. In 2001 the first floor was inserted directly into the mosque, which all but jeopardised the structural beauty defined by the relationship between the domes and the mihrabs. After the construction of the first floor, the beauty of the domes and mihrabs remains undecipherable where the former's view is completely obstructed by the roof of the first floor and the latter's size has been greatly altered. The architecture of the Bibi Maryam Mosque is defined by a combination of embellishments and proportional adjustment among elements such as arches, domes, mihrabs etc., all of which have been used in a series of three members. In such elements, the middle one is much larger and more emphasised than those that flank it. For instance, the interior space was roofed by the three domes where the central dome is much larger than the subsidiary ones located on either side. The use of three domes in such a manner for a mosque is a very distinctive feature of the Mughal style. There is a minaret situated at the eastern corner of the main building which was built during the 1971 Liberation War and has lost its authentic features due to later repairs which completely modernised it. The interior hall has simple lateral arches, but the side domes have been reduced in size by adjusting the thickness of the side walls. The three domes are embellished with basal leaf imitations and the walls are fortified.  The embellishment of the outer surfaces or walls which in the contemporary typical Mughal mosques were plaques and floral and geometric motifs are also untraceable. A veranda has been later added alongside the first floor due to the eastern facade of the mosque to accommodate more worshipers which have marred the beauty of the mosque. Originally there was an open plaza that adjoined the eastern facade adding to its beauty and measuring 50 feet by 20 feet. The mosque even though rectangular in shape but looked more like a square where the 50 feet width is marginally bigger than its 45 feet breadth.

Relationship with the complex
The historical records clarify that the fortified complex existed prior to both the simultaneously constructed masjid and shrine it houses. This complex is entirely fortified with 4-foot-wide and 12-foot-high boundary walls and the prime building is the Bibi Maryam Shrine. The masjid faces the shrine located exactly opposite to it and its central axis is aligned with that of the shrine. The masjid was built simultaneously with the shrine to fulfil the need for congregational prayer and secondly to complement the significance of the shrine by availing the scope for worshipers to pray for the deceased Bibi Maryam's salvation. This shrine leads to a subsidiary shrine and located at the western end of the Masjid is a secret passage by which Nawab Shaista Khan's soldiers could access the Hajiganj Fort. The rectangle-shaped Bibi Maryam shrine is accessible from all directions with five arches on all its facades and is topped by a dome. Unlike the Bibi Maryam Masjid the shrine has retained all its architectural qualities despite undergoing conservation numerous times. It reflects the age during which it was built. After the 1971 Liberation war substantial area of the Bibi Maryam complex has been consumed by Bibi Maryam Girls Primary School, for which a large part of the eastern and southern fortifications had to be demolished. The shrines and the masjid are located on elevated surfaces. Another building is located adjoining the fortified walls in the southern direction, which was the dwelling of Nawab's soldiers who guarded the complex. The main shrine is a monochromatic structure plastered with light-brown surfaces and adorned with recessed rectangular panels. The parapet of the shrine is decorated in the same style as the top of the fortified boundary walls. It is presented with a set of three arches in the middle flanked at the right and left sides by a single arch of identical size and features. The shrine has been built on an elevated platform which measures three feet high and is accessed by a recessed staircase whose appearance is absolutely ruined.

Mughal embellishments of the Masjid

Although the plaques and motifs which adorned the Bibi Maryam Masjid disappeared long ago, still the themes can be deduced by analysing those still preserved in the shrine and other buildings of the complex. Some of the embellishments were produced as patterns of voids and minute angular shapes by piercing the walls directly. The other elements are basically projected or recessed rectangular plaques and floral and geometric motifs. The latter types also enhance the incident natural lighting in buildings both for comfort and aesthetic purposes. This strategy has been commonly employed in Islamic architecture and is strongly featured in the shrine and subsidiary shrine.

But, unlike the shrine, it has transformed radically under the different conservation and construction phases. The Masjid stands completely deprived of its true architectural significance. Several books have been written to unravel its wonders albeit with limited hypothetical conclusions and are oriented more towards the sensitivity of its values. The scarcity of the information is attributed to its faint documentation in the context of history and the irresponsibility of the government in treating it as a national heritage. However, it is not absolutely dilapidated, since a lot can be traced from the surviving elements such as domes, arches and load-bearing walls that defined the space in its inception.

References

Bibliography
 Zakaria, A.K.M (2004). Bangladesher Prachin Kirti. Dhaka: University Press Limited. (pp. 161–162).
 Bangladesh Asiatec Society (2007).  Banglapedia. Dhaka: Bangladesh Jatiyo Gyankosh. (pp .  241–242).
 Mamoon. M (2008) Dhaka Sritir Bisritir Nagari. Ananya. (pp.   180).

Mughal mosques
Mosques in Bangladesh
Narayanganj District